Sant Martí d'Empúries is an entity of the town of L'Escala. It is located next to the ruins of Empúries or Empòrion. Ancient Greeks established the settlement in the 6th century BC. It was the county seat until 1079 Empúries moved to Castelló d'Empúries place less exposed to attack.

Sant Martí d'Empúries is a staging point on the GR 92 long distance footpath, which roughly follows the length of the Mediterranean coast of Spain.

History

It was an inhabited place since the arrival of Greeks from Massalia, actual Marseille (France) in the 6th century BC. Greeks established a settlement there called it, Kypsela. At the ancient times there is a possibility that there was a temple of Artemis on the island.

It was Christianized by Saint Feliu, an African martyr who died in 304 in Girona. He was bishop between 516 and 693. Charlemagne mentions Ermenguer as first Count of Empúries in 812.

References

External links 
 Sant Martí d'Empúries Parish. 

Populated places in Alt Empordà
Greek colonies in Iberia
Ancient Greek archaeological sites in Spain